Punkie may refer to:

Punkie Night, an English custom practiced on the last Thursday of October
"Punkie", a song by Sean Paul from his 2002 album Dutty Rock
Ceratopogonidae, a biting insect
Punkie Johnson, an American comedian and actress

See also
Punky (disambiguation)